Cherish or variants may refer to:

Film 
 Cherish (film), a 2002 film by Finn Taylor
 Cherished (film), a 2005 film by Robin Shepperd

Music 
 Cherish (group), an American R&B, soul, and hip hop quartet
 Cherish (David Cassidy album) (1972)
 Cherish (Seiko Matsuda album) (2011)
 "Cherish" (The Association song) (1966)
 "Cherish" (Kool & the Gang song) (1985)
 "Cherish" (Madonna song) (1989)
 "Cherish", a song by Ai Otsuka from Love Cook
 "Cherish", a song by Beni Arashiro from Girl 2 Lady
 "Cherish", a song by Nana Mizuki from Alive & Kicking
 "Cherish", a song by News from Touch
 Cherished, a 1977 album by Cher

Fictional characters
 Valerie Cherish, a character in The Comeback
 Cherish, a character in Zatch Bell!

See also